Newport Creamery is a chain of restaurants in Rhode Island and southern Massachusetts. Since its first restaurant opened in 1940, it has been primarily known for ice cream and, later, the "Awful Awful" milkshake. The company is based in Middletown, Rhode Island.

History 
Newport Creamery began with Samuel Rector's Newport, Rhode Island dairy business in 1928. Rector began as a wholesaler and started home delivery in 1932. In 1940, Rector and his son opened their first restaurant in nearby Middletown, where the company is still headquartered. For its first 13 years, the restaurant sold only ice cream, adding other food to the menu in 1953. In the 1950s and 1960s, it was franchised, eventually expanding to 33 restaurants.

In the late 1990s, the company ran into financial trouble, losing money, deferring maintenance, and closing 12 of its locations. In 1999 the Rector family sold the chain to Florida businessman, Robert Swain, for $7.6 million. Swain tried to expand the business's geographic coverage into Massachusetts and Connecticut. The expansion was unsuccessful, and was followed by contraction. The company filed for bankruptcy protection in 2000. In 2001, Jan Companies, a local Burger King franchisee, purchased the company for only $1.55 million.

 the company has 12 locations. Ten are located in Rhode Island, and two are in southern Massachusetts.

Awful Awful 
The chain is known for Awful Awful milkshakes, made from blended syrups and a proprietary ice milk. The drink started at the New Jersey–based chain, Bond's, in the 1940s. The name comes from a Bond's customer who called it "awful big and awful good". In 1948, Bond's licensed it to Newport Creamery and then to Massachusetts-based Friendly's. The terms of the license mandated the two New England businesses not sell it in New Jersey, leading the expanding Friendly's chain to rebrand it as a "Fribble", and later changing its formula to be more like a traditional milkshake with ice cream instead of ice milk. When Bond's went out of business in the 1970s, Newport Creamery purchased the trademark and continues to serve the original recipe.

Media 

Newport Creamery was featured on a 2019 episode of the Cooking Channel's Man v. Food, where host Casey Webb successfully finished three Awful Awful milkshakes in one sitting.

References

External links 
 Newport Creamery
 The Jan Companies

Companies based in Rhode Island
Ice cream parlors in the United States
Regional restaurant chains in the United States
Restaurant franchises
Restaurants established in 1940
Restaurants in Massachusetts
Restaurants in Rhode Island
Rhode Island culture
1940 establishments in Rhode Island